Happy Diving is an American rock band from Oakland, California.

History
Happy Diving began in 2014 with the release of a self-titled EP on Father/Daughter Records. Happy Diving released their first full-length album titled Big World in 2014 on Father/Daughter Records. In 2015, Happy Diving released an EP titled So Bunted on Topshelf Records. In 2016, Happy Diving released their second full-length album titled Electric Soul Unity via Topshelf Records.

Band members
Matt Berry - Guitar/Vocals
Samuelito Cruz - Drums
Mikey Rivera - Bass
Kevin Prochnow - Guitar
Matt Yankovich - Guitar

Discography
Studio albums
Big World (2014, Father/Daughter)
Electric Soul Unity (2015, Topshelf)
EPs
Happy Diving (2014, Father/Daughter)
So Bunted (2015, Topshelf)

References

Musical groups established in 2014
Musical groups from Oakland, California
Rock music groups from California
Father/Daughter Records artists
Topshelf Records artists
2014 establishments in California